The Bureau of Pensions was an agency of the federal government of the United States which existed from 1832 to 1930. It originally administered pensions solely for military personnel. Pension duties were transferred to the United States Department of the Interior in 1849. The death of many pensioners in the early 1900s greatly reduced the agency's workload. The agency closed in 1930 when its duties were transferred to the Veterans Administration.

History
The first government pensions in American history were awarded to naval officers in 1799. Naval pensions were administered by a commission composed of the Secretary of War, Secretary of the Navy, and Secretary of the Army from 1799 to 1832. The commission dissolved in 1832, and the Secretary of the Navy administered the pension plan alone until 1840. In 1828, Congress enacted legislation granting pensions to all remaining American Revolutionary War veterans. These pensions were administered by the Secretary of the Treasury. In 1833, Congress created a "Commissioner of Pensions" within the War Department, and transferred the Treasury's pension function to this new office.

Congress created the Department of the Interior in 1849, and transferred the Commissioner of Pensions office to it. Renamed the Bureau of Pensions, the agency had two duties: Assess and either approve or deny claims, and to pay benefits. The office moved into the new Patent Office Building, where it stayed for 38 years. The massive increase in pension processing required by the Civil War led to the construction of a massive, new Pension Bureau Building. The Bureau of Pensions moved into this structure in 1887.

With the death of many Civil War veterans beginning in the early 1900s (more than 500,000 had died between 1900 and 1920, requiring a 50 percent reduction in bureau staff), the Bureau of Pensions no longer needed the vast space of the Pension Bureau Building.  The agency moved into the Interior Building in early 1926.

On July 21, 1930, President Herbert Hoover signed an executive order merging the Bureau of Pensions, Veterans' Bureau, and Home for Disabled Volunteer Soldiers into a single Veterans Administration. This ended the Bureau of Pensions' existence as a federal agency.

References

Bibliography
Cimbala, Paul and Miller, Randall. Union Soldiers and the Northern Home Front: Wartime Experiences, Postwar Adjustments. New York: Fordham University Press, 2002.
Cumberbatch, Rudolph. Failure Masquerading as Success: The Veterans Healthcare System: A Microcosm of the Current Federal Government. Bloomington, Ind.: AuthorHouse, 2008.
Moeller, Gerard Martin and Feldblyum, Boris. AIA Guide to the Architecture of Washington, D.C. Baltimore, Md.: Johns Hopkins University Press, 2012.
National Archives and Records Administration. Guide to the National Archives of the United States. Washington, D.C.: National Archives and Records Administration, 1987.
National Park Service. Report of the Director of the National Park Service to the Secretary of the Interior for the Fiscal Year Ended June 30, 1924. United States Department of the Interior. Washington, D.C.: Government Printing Office, 1924.
Secretary of the Interior. Annual Report of the Department of the Interior for the Fiscal Year Ended June 30, 1926. United States Department of the Interior. Washington, D.C.: Government Printing Office, 1926.

United States Department of the Interior